KHHZ (97.7 FM) is a radio station broadcasting a Regional Mexican format. Licensed to Gridley, California, United States, the station serves the Chico area. The station is currently owned by Bustos Media, through licensee Bustos Media Holdings, LLC, and features programming from CNN Radio.

History
The station went on the air as KEWE on 14 February 1979. On 1 October 1996, it changed its call sign to KZCO, and on 10 March 2000 to the current KHHZ.

References

External links
KHHZ-FM official website (Spanish)

HHZ
Regional Mexican radio stations in the United States
HHZ